Gabriele Kröcher-Tiedemann (18 May 1951 – 7 October 1995) was a German far-left militant, associated with Movement 2 June (J2M) and the Second Generation Red Army Faction. She was the wife of the J2M terrorist Norbert Kröcher. Her nom de guerre was "Nada".

Biography

Early life
Kröcher-Tiedemann was born in Ziegendorf in Mecklenburg, East Germany on 18 May 1951. She studied at a grammar school in Bielefeld before moving to Berlin to study politics and sociology. At that time she was associated with communist communes in Berlin.

Crimes
It is not clear at what point Kröcher-Tiedemann went underground, but in 1973 she shot a policeman in a Buchen carpark after he tried to arrest her for stealing number plates. She was subsequently arrested and was sentenced to eight years in prison.

However, as a result of the Peter Lorenz kidnapping prisoner exchange, she was freed two years later in 1975 and flown to South Yemen.

OPEC siege
On 21 December 1975 she participated with the international terrorist "Carlos the Jackal" in a raid on the OPEC headquarters in Vienna. There she murdered two people: one was a 76 year old policeman interpreter named Anton Tichler and the other was a plainclothes Iraqi bodyguard who had grabbed hold of Kröcher-Tiedemann. While he was attempting to control her weapon, Kröcher-Tiedemann produced a second gun and shot the man through the head.

The raid was successful and, on 22 December, 42 hostages as well as the hostage takers were flown to Algiers, then Tripoli and then Algiers again. All the hostages were freed and the terrorists were all given asylum.

Walter Palmers
In November 1977, Kröcher-Tiedemann working again with J2M, kidnapped an Austrian millionaire named Walter Palmers, and successfully managed to obtain a $2 million ransom in exchange for his freedom.

Capture, imprisonment and death
Kröcher-Tiedemann resurfaced in December 1977 when she shot two Swiss customs men after they attempted to arrest her at Porrentruy, near the Swiss border. Both survived, although one would remain paralysed for life. She was subsequently arrested and in her baggage weapons, forged I.D. papers, blueprints of the Israeli embassy in Berlin and $20,000 (of Palmer's ransom money) were found. Kröcher-Tiedemann spent the next 10 years in a Swiss prison, and in 1987 she was extradited back to West Germany, where she was charged with her part in the OPEC raid. However, due to lack of evidence she was acquitted in May 1990.

Suffering from ill health, Kröcher-Tiedemann was released from prison in 1991. She was operated on five times in 1992 and on 7 October 1995 she finally succumbed to cancer at the age of 44.

In popular culture
Kröcher-Tiedemann was portrayed by Julia Hummer in the 2010 French television miniseries Carlos.

References

1951 births
1995 deaths
People from Ludwigslust-Parchim
Members of the 2 June Movement
Members of the Red Army Faction
German people imprisoned abroad
People extradited to Germany
People extradited from Switzerland
Deaths from cancer in Germany